Sita Rama Kalyanam is a 1961 Indian Telugu-language Hindu mythological film directed by N. T. Rama Rao in his directorial debut. It stars N. T. Rama Rao, Haranath, Geetanjali, B. Saroja Devi, Kanta Rao, Sobhan Babu. The film was produced by N. Trivikrama Rao on 'National Art Theatres' banner. The music composed by Gali Penchala Narasimha Rao.

The film was a commercial success. It also won the Certificate of Merit for Best Feature Film in Telugu at the 8th National Film Awards. The film was dubbed into Tamil with the same title and was released on 3 February 1961.

Plot 
The film begins with the demon king Ravana visiting Kailasa, the abode of Lord Siva, at an inopportune time. He is obstructed by the guardian deity Nandi who warns him against going in and disturbing Siva's privacy. A rift between them forces an enraged Nandi to curse Ravana that an army of monkeys would destroy him. In retaliation, Ravana decides to uproot Kailasa and uses all his strength to do so. Siva notices this and presses the land with his big toe, trapping Ravana completely beneath the mountain he was lifting. Ravana worries about his safety and sings hymns in praise of Siva, who finally forgives and blesses him.

Siva's blessings make Ravana invincible, who soon conquers multiple worlds. The deities reach Lord Vishnu and request him to intervene, who promises to address it at the opportune time. In a chance encounter, he falls for the beauty of celestial Rambha and molests her. Rambha's fiancée Nalakuvara curses Ravana to die when he aspires to possess any woman without her wish. Goddess Lakshmi then chose to take birth as Vedavathi on Earth, for whom Ravana develops a liking a few years later. When he wishes to molest her, Vedavathi commits suicide after cursing to be reborn and cause his death, setting Nalakuvara and Nandi's curses into action. She is born as Sita accordingly, and is adopted by Janaka, the king of Mithila.

Around the same time, as a result of a Putrakameshti Yagna, King Dasaratha of Ayodhya and his three wives beget four children. Vishnu is born as Rama, the eldest of the four. Years later, Rama and his brother Lakshmana join the gurukula of sage Visvamitra when the latter requests Dasaratha security for a yagna they are conducting in the forest. Visvamitra trains the duo in warfare and administration, which helps them in killing the demons Tataka and Maricha who try to obstruct the yagna. As the purpose of their stay is completed, Visvamitra takes Rama and Lakshmana to an old hermit, where Rama's presence helps the cursed woman Ahalya in regaining her human form.

Meanwhile, in Mithila, Janaka has arranged svayamvara for Sita, and various kings attend as prospective bridegrooms. Ravana too joins them uninvited along with Rama, who has only accompanied Visvamitra as an audience. The challenge posed is to affix and subsequently break the bow gifted by Siva to Janaka's ancestors. As Ravana and others fail, Rama lifts the bow with Siva's blessings and breaks it. This enraged Siva's devotee Parasurama who confronts Rama. Later, he realizes that Rama is an incarnation of Vishnu just like him, and backs off. The film ends on a happy note with the wedding of Sita and Rama.

Cast 
N. T. Rama Rao as Ravana
B. Saroja Devi as Mandodari
Haranath as Rama
Geetanjali as Sita
Kanta Rao as Narada
Sobhan Babu as Lakshmana
V. Nagayya as Dasaratha
Mikkilineni as Janaka
Gummadi as Vishwamitra
K. V. S. Sarma as Parashurama
Kommineni Seshagiri Rao as Bharata
M. Kameswara Rao as Brahma
Udaykumar as Kumbhakarna
A. V. Subba Rao Jr. as Vibhishana
Arja Janardhana Rao as Hiranyakashipu
Kasturi Siva Rao as Vaishya
Sarathi as Nalakubara
Master Nagaraju as Prahlada / Young Lakshmana
Chhaya Devi as Sumedha Devi (Janaka's wife)
Swarna as Soorpanakha
Kuchala Kumari as Rambha

Production

N. T. Rama Rao portrayal of the demon king Ravana (the antagonist of the Hindu epic Ramayana) in Bhookailas (1958) earned him critical acclaim. However, after the release of its Kannada-language version Bhookailasa in the same year which featured a different cast and crew, Rama Rao's portrayal was often compared with that of Rajkumar who played Ravana. This, along with Ravana's reputation as a renowned Shiva devotee, made Rama Rao consider reprising the role in another film which focused on a more layered representation of the character. He and writer Samudrala Sr. studied Ravana's arcs from various versions of Ramayana and other mythologies. Later, Rama Rao's friend Dhanekula Buchi Venkata Krishna Chowdhary came up with a story which they liked, and Samudrala wrote the dialogues, songs and poems. Though the film's narrative was centered around Ravana, Samudrala named the film Sita Rama Kalyanam after Ramayana protagonists Rama and Sita.

Rama Rao's brother N. Trivikrama Rao decided to produce the film for his company National Art Theatre and approached the former's mentor K. V. Reddy to direct the film. Reddy declined the offer, saying that he could not envision Rama Rao playing a demon. Rama Rao then decided to direct the film himself, marking his directorial debut. He, however, refrained from crediting himself as the director and instead paid homage to his parents. When Trivikrama Rao suggested that Rama Rao should play a dual role as both Rama and Ravana, the latter refused and chose to work with younger actors. He met Haranath at Pondy Bazaar and signed him to play Rama. Sobhan Babu was cast as Rama's brother Lakshmana. Impressed with her cameo appearance in Rani Ratnaprabha (1960), Rama Rao cast Geetanjali for the role of Sita. B. Saroja Devi, Gummadi and V. Nagayya were cast in key supporting roles. Sita Rama Kalyanam also marked Kanta Rao first on-screen appearance as Narada, a mythological character which he would reprise later in multiple unrelated Telugu films.

Rama Rao approached M. A. Rahman, the cinematographer of the former's acting debut Mana Desam (1949), to collaborate for this film as the director of photography. When Rahman was unavailable, he signed Ravikant Nagaich for the job, marking the latter's debut in Telugu cinema. S. P. S. Veerappa edited the film and I. N. Murthy served as the co-director. All the sequences were filmed in sets erected at the Vijaya Vauhini Studios in Madras (now Chennai). For filming the Ravananugraha sequence, Nagaich opted for using mask shots capturing varying expressions of Rama Rao instead of working with nine dummy heads. This took more than ten hours to shoot, and Rama Rao had to stay motionless for longer intervals.

Music
S. Rajeswara Rao was signed to compose the film's soundtrack and score. He worked on the song "Kanarara Kailasa Nivasa" and a poem "Jayatwada Bravibhrama" before walking out of the film citing creative differences with Rama Rao. Gali Penchala Narasimha Rao replaced him and composed the score and the remaining songs. Samudrala wrote the lyrics for all the songs and composed the poems. Emani Sankara Sastry recited the veena for the Ravananugraha sequence. The soundtrack was released on 31 December 1961 and was marketed by HMV (now Saregama).

Release and reception 
Sita Rama Kalyanam was released theatrically on 6 January 1961, in 28 centres, with an attempt to cash in on the Makara Sankranti holiday weekend. Due to good word of mouth, the film was a commercial success, completing a 50-day run in all the 28 centres. It also completed a 156-day run at the Sri Lakshmi Picture Palace in Vijayawada. It also won the Certificate of Merit for Best Feature Film in Telugu at the 8th National Film Awards. The film was dubbed into Tamil with the same title and was released on 3 February 1961.

References

External links 
 

1960 films
Best Telugu Feature Film National Film Award winners
Films based on the Ramayana
Films directed by N. T. Rama Rao
1960s Telugu-language films
1960 directorial debut films
Films scored by Gali Penchala Narasimha Rao